George Herbert Hyde Villiers, 6th Earl of Clarendon,  (7 June 1877 – 13 December 1955), styled Lord Hyde from 1877 to 1914, was a British Conservative politician from the Villiers family. He served as Governor-General of the Union of South Africa from 1931 to 1937.

Background
Clarendon was the only son of Edward Hyde Villiers, 5th Earl of Clarendon and his wife Lady Caroline Elizabeth Agar, daughter of James Agar, 3rd Earl of Normanton. George William Frederick Villiers, 4th Earl of Clarendon, three times Foreign Secretary, was his grandfather.

Political career
Lord Hyde was in November 1902 appointed an extra aide-de-camp to the Earl of Dudley, Lord Lieutenant of Ireland.

Clarendon took his seat on the Conservative benches in the House of Lords on his father's death in 1914. When Bonar Law became Prime Minister in 1922 he appointed Clarendon Captain of the Honourable Corps of Gentlemen-at-Arms (government chief whip in the House of Lords), a position he also held under Stanley Baldwin until January 1924, and again from December 1924 to 1925. He then served as the first Under-Secretary of State for Dominion Affairs until 1927. In 1931 Clarendon was appointed Governor-General of South Africa, in which position he remained until 1937. During his tenure as Governor-General of South Africa, he also served as Chief Scout of South Africa. Clarendon High School for Girls and its associated schools, Clarendon Primary School and Clarendon Preparatory School in East London, South Africa are named after him.

Clarendon became Lord Chamberlain in 1938 and served until the death of King George VI in 1952. He was sworn of the Privy Council in 1931 and made a Knight of the Garter in 1937.

Family
Lord Clarendon married Adeline Verena Ishbel Cocks, daughter of Herbert Haldane Somers Cocks, in 1905.

They had three children:
 George Villiers, Lord Hyde, killed in a shooting accident in South Africa in 1935, leaving a son George Frederick Laurence and a posthumous daughter, Rosemary. 
 (Nina) Joan Villiers, Lady Newman
 (William) Nicholas Villiers.

He died in December 1955, aged 78. His eldest son George Villiers, Lord Hyde, had been killed in a shooting accident in 1935; the earldom was inherited by George's son Laurence.

Honours

  He was awarded the Freedom of the Borough of Watford on 28 July 1924. 
  He was made a Knight Grand Cross of the Order of St Michael and St George on 2 December 1930, which would normally allow him the Title "Sir" but this was outranked by his peerage so was not used. It gave him the Post Nominal Letters "GCMG" for life. 
 He was sworn in as a member of His Majesty's Most Honourable Privy Council in 1931. This allowed him the Honorific Title "The Right Honourable" and the Post Nominal Letters "PC" for life. 
  He was made a Knight of the Order of the Garter in 1937 by HM King George VI, which would normally allow him the Title "Sir" but this was outranked by his peerage so was not used. It gave him the Post Nominal Letters "KG" for life. 
  He was made a Knight Grand Cross of the Order of the Royal Victorian Order on 8 June 1939 by HM King George VI, which would normally allow him the Title "Sir" but this was outranked by his peerage so was not used. It gave him the Post Nominal Letters "GCVO" for life. He also served as Chancellor of the Order from 1938-1952.  
  He was made a Bailiff Grand Cross of the Order of St John on 18 June 1940. Within the Order this allowed him the post nominal letters "GCStJ" for life. He also served as Prior of the Order from 1943–1946. 
  He was awarded the Royal Victorian Chain on 21 October 1952. by HM Queen Elizabeth II.
  He was appointed a Deputy Lieutenant of Hertfordshire. This gave him the Post Nominal Letters "DL" for life.

References

External links
 

1877 births
1955 deaths
Bailiffs Grand Cross of the Order of St John
Chairmen of the BBC
Conservative Party (UK) Baronesses- and Lords-in-Waiting
Deputy Lieutenants of Hertfordshire
6
Governors-General of South Africa
Honourable Corps of Gentlemen at Arms
Knights of the Garter
Knights Grand Cross of the Order of St Michael and St George
Knights Grand Cross of the Royal Victorian Order
Members of the Privy Council of the United Kingdom
Permanent Lords-in-Waiting
Scouting and Guiding in South Africa
George Villiers, 6th Earl of Clarendon
Villiers, George
Presidents of the Southern Africa Association for the Advancement of Science